Atajan Qorbanli (also Romanized as ‘Aţājān Qorbānlī; to some people known as ‘Aţājān Qorbān) is a village in Maraveh Tappeh Rural District, in the Central District of Maraveh Tappeh County, Golestan Province, Iran. At the 2006 census, its population was 61, in 11 families.

References 

Populated places in Maraveh Tappeh County